Kecmanović is a Serbo-Croatian surname. Notable people with the surname include:

Miomir Kecmanović (born 1999), Serbian tennis player
Nenad Kecmanović (born 1947), Bosnian Serb political scientist, sociologist, political analyst, publicist and retired politician
Vojislav Kecmanović (1881–1961), first President of the Republic of Bosnia and Herzegovina

Bosnian surnames
Serbian surnames
Slavic-language surnames
Patronymic surnames